Clover may refer to the following communities in West Virginia:
Clover, Cabell County, West Virginia
Clover, Roane County, West Virginia